Asian College (formerly Asian Institute of Electronics and Asian College of Science and Technology) is a CHED and TESDA-accredited private tertiary educational institution in the Philippines founded in 1972. It has campuses in Quezon City and Dumaguete. It also offers DepEd and TESDA-certified senior high school.

History
Asian College was founded as the Asian Institute of Electronics (AIE) in 1972 by Dr. Constancio A. Sia and his wife, Gloria Durano-Sia. Within 15 years, it managed to expand campuses outside Metro Manila. The Baliuag branch was opened in 1988, followed by Dumaguete in 1991, and then Cagayan de Oro in 1994. In the succeeding years, it managed to open other campuses in different locations across the country specifically on: Novaliches, Caloocan, and Alabang in National Capital Region; Masinag and Antipolo in Region 4; and Cabanatuan in Region 3. Six (6) franchised campuses were subsequently established, namely Carriedo, Manila and Mandaluyong in National Capital Region; Sta Maria, Bulacan and Pampanga in Region 3; Calamba, Laguna in Region 4 and Sorsogon in Region 5. Student population mainly determine the longevity of the campuses.

In June 1995, AIE was accredited by then-DECS (Department of Education Culture and Sports), as a full-fledged college, thus a change in name to Asian College of Science and Technology (ACSAT).

In 2012, the board of trustees decided to change the short name of the school to “Asian College” to emphasize that the institution does not merely cater on science and technology courses alone, but also focuses on developing professionals in the fields of business and management.

Current campuses
Quezon City campus (Main Campus)
8F/ 1013 Aurora Blvd., Project 3, Quezon City
Dumaguete campus
Dr. V. Locsin Street, Dumaguete

References
Asian College official website

External links
Asian College Quezon City campus on Facebook
Asian College Dumaguete campus on Facebook

Educational institutions established in 1972
1972 establishments in the Philippines
Universities and colleges in the Philippines